Arasangudy  is a village in Tiruchirappalli taluk of Tiruchirappalli district, Tamil Nadu.

Demographics 

As per the 2001 census, Arasangudy had a population of 1206 with 611 males and 595 females. The sex ratio was 974 and the literacy rate, 76.8.

References 

 

Villages in Tiruchirappalli district